Phoenix Hotel may refer to:

Phoenix Hotel, Turku
Phoenix Hotel (Rison, Arkansas)
Phoenix Hotel (Waycross, Georgia)
Phoenix Hotel (Lexington, Kentucky)
Phoenix Hotel (Dedham, Massachusetts)

See also 
Hotel Phoenix Copenhagen